The Burdwood Bank, called Namuncurá in Argentina and other countries, is an undersea bank with a prominence of approximately 200 metres (110 fathoms), part of the Scotia Arc projecting some  from Cape Horn in the South Atlantic Ocean and located some  south of the Falkland Islands. Argentina claims economic rights over the whole of the bank, while the United Kingdom has designated about half of the bank as part of the Falklands Outer Economic Zone.

The Burdwood Bank is one of the four morphological features defined by the 200 metre (110 fathom) isobath off the coast of the Argentine — the other three being the Patagonian Shelf (Argentine Coastal Shelf), Isla de los Estados and the Falkland Islands. It forms a barrier to the northward flow of the Antarctic Circumpolar Current.

Burdwood Bank was the location of several landslides some three million years ago. This in turn produced tsunami-like events that hit the Falkland Islands on its southern coast.

Fauna
Birds in this area include various species of albatrosses and petrels that feed on the banks and waters of Burdwood Bank: black-browed albatross, grey-headed albatross, wandering albatross, Tristan albatross, northern giant petrel, southern giant petrel, chin petrel White, as well as penguins: Magellanic penguin, rockhopper penguin, gentoo penguin, king penguin, and pinnipeds such as sea lions and elephant seals. The Burdwood Bank generates conditions that favor fishing productivity in the area. In the waters surrounding the bank are breeding and spawning sites for many fish species. The species community on the bank is dominated by the small notothenids Patagonotothen guntheri and Patagonian toothfish. There are also very high levels of chlorophyll.

References

External links
Burdwood Bank/Namuncurá Marine Protected Area

Landforms of Argentina
Landforms of the Falkland Islands
Continental shelves
Undersea banks of the Atlantic Ocean